Odontocera parallela is a species of beetle in the family Cerambycidae. It is found in the state of Amapá, Brazil.

References

Odontocera